Breeds is an unincorporated community in Fulton County, Illinois, United States. Breeds is east of Canton.

References

Unincorporated communities in Fulton County, Illinois
Unincorporated communities in Illinois